Protein O-mannosyl-transferase 1 is an enzyme that in humans is encoded by the POMT1 gene. It is a member of the dolichyl-phosphate-mannose-protein mannosyltransferases.

Function 

O-mannosylation is an important protein modification in eukaryotes that is initiated by an evolutionarily conserved family of protein O-mannosyltransferases. POMT1 shares sequence similarity with protein O-mannosyltransferases of S. cerevisiae. In yeast, these enzymes are located in the endoplasmic reticulum (ER) and are required for cell integrity and cell wall rigidity. POMT1 also shows similarity to the Drosophila 'rotated abdomen' (rt) gene, which when mutated causes defects in myogenesis and muscle structure.[supplied by OMIM]

It is associated with limb-girdle muscular dystrophy type LGMD2K.

In the retina it is known that O-mannosylation of α-DG carried out by POMT1 is crucial for the establishment of proper synapses at the outer plexiform layer and the transmission of visual information from cones and rods to their postsynaptic neurons, i.e. bipolar and horizontal cells. Lack of POMT1 expression results in a good number of impairments in photoreceptors that have been documented at the proteomic, morphological and physiological levels.

References

Further reading

External links 
  GeneReviews/NCBI/NIH/UW entry on Congenital Muscular Dystrophy Overview
  GeneReviews/NCBI/NIH/UW entry on Anophthalmia / Microphthalmia Overview